Ruth Lade Okediji (born 1963) is the Jeremiah Smith. Jr, Professor of Law at Harvard Law School and co-director of the Berkman Klein Center. Professor Okediji is an internationally renowned expert and scholar on intellectual property, trade and development. In 2017 she was appointed as part of the Creative Commons Board.

Education 
Okediji received her LL.M. and S.J.D. from Harvard Law School.  Prior to that, she received an LL.B. from the University of Jos.

Career 
Okediji had a long teaching career before coming to Harvard Law in 2017.  From 20032017, she taught at the University of Minnesota Law School where she was the William L. Prosser Professor of Law and appointed as a McKnight Presidential Professor. Prior to her tenure at Minnesota, she was the Edith Gaylord Presidential Professor of Law at the University of Oklahoma College of Law.  She also held visiting professorships at Duke University School of Law, the University of Haifa Law School, the University of St. Thomas School of Law, and the University of Tilburg Law School.

Bibliography

References

External links 

 Professor Ruth Okediji talks on Copyright and Public Interest at the IFLA Presidential Meeting, 2011.

Living people
University of Minnesota Law School faculty
Harvard Law School alumni
1963 births